HSE may refer to: Health, Safety and Environment

Organisations
 Health and Safety Executive, regulation and enforcement of workplace health, safety and welfare agency in the UK
 Health Service Executive, provision of health and personal social services in the Republic of Ireland
 Holding Slovenske elektrarne, a Slovene power company

Education
 Hamilton Southeastern Schools, the primary school system in Fishers, Indiana, US
 Hamilton Southeastern High School, a public high school
 Helsinki School of Economics, Finland
 National Research University – Higher School of Economics, Moscow, Russia

Stock exchanges
 Helsinki Stock Exchange
 Hyderabad Stock Exchange

Science and technology
 Half sphere exposure, a protein solvent exposure measure
 Heyd-Scuseria-Ernzerhof functional, in computational quantum mechanical modelling
 Hydrostatic equilibrium, in fluid mechanics
 Higher Speed Ethernet, in computer networking
 Highly Siderophile element, in planetary geology
 Hybrid search engine, a type of computer search engine

Health and medicine
 Health, Safety and Environment, a discipline focused on regulation and enforcement of workplace health, safety, environmental issues, and welfare in some countries
 Health Survey for England, a statistical survey 
 Herpes simplex encephalitis, a viral infection

Other uses
 Human systems engineering, in systems psychology
 Billy Mitchell Airport, Cape Hatteras, North Carolina, United States, IATA and FAA LID code HSE
 High Specification Equipment, a trim level for Range Rover
 Home Sports Entertainment, a cable sports TV channel that was the forerunner of Fox Sports Southwest